Kings of Dance (season 2) is a 2017-2018 Tamil language reality Dance show which aired on Star Vijay on every Saturday and Sunday at 21:30 (IST) starting from 7 October 2017. Tamil Film Dancer choreographers Raju Sundaram, Sheriff, Sandy and Jeffrey are the judges of this season. The show ended with 41 Episodes from 4 March 2018.

Overview
The show is a dance competition for contestants of any age as individuals or in a team.

Creative Team
 Rahul Vijay
 Manivannan
 Sithara
 Prabhu
 Sugenthiran
 Grace Veronica
 Deepak
 Laxman

Audition
 Thoothukudi
 Madurai
 Coimbatore
 Chennai

Finalist
 Velammal Kids from Team Jeffery
 Ashwin Scott from Team Jeffery
 Yobu and Mercyna from Team Jeffery
 ADS kids from Team Sherif
 Laab crew from Team Sherif
 Bipin princy from Team Jeffery
 O2 from Team Sandy
 Vignesh from Team Sherif

Winners
 Title Winner      :  LAAB Crew From Team Sherif 
 1st Runner-up     :  ADS kids From Team Sherif 
 2nd Runner-up     :  Bipin and Princy From Team Jeffery
 3rd Runner-up     :  Ashwin Scott From Team Jeffery
 Consolation Prize :  o2 From Sandy Team

Judges
 Raju Sundaram: is a National Award-winning Indian choreographerd actor who has primarily worked on Tamil and Telugu language films. A few Films-Jeans (1998), Quick Gun Murugan (2009).
 Sheriff: a Tamil cinema choreographer, who recently choreographed for the blockbuster actor Vijay’s Theri. He was the title winner in dance reality show like a Ungalil yar adutha Prabhudeva. 
 Sandy or Santhosh Kumar debut season of Maanada Mayilada Dance show choreographed movie poda podi, gethu etc.
 Jeffrey #hotshoe# dance club owner, southindia profesional certified  salsa dancer

References

External links
Vijay TV Official Website on Hotstar

2018 Tamil-language television seasons